Pristimantis bicolor is a species of frog in the family Strabomantidae.
It is endemic to Colombia.
Its natural habitats are tropical moist montane forests and rivers.
It is threatened by habitat loss.

References

bicolor
Amphibians of Colombia
Endemic fauna of Colombia
Amphibians described in 1983
Taxonomy articles created by Polbot